S. fenestrata may refer to:
 Sphodromantis fenestrata, a praying mantis species found in Ethiopia, Kenya, Somalia, Sudan and Tanzania
 Symplecta fenestrata, de Meijere, 1913, a crane fly species in the genus Symplecta

See also
 Sphinx fenestrata, a synonym for Amata polymita, the tiger-striped clearwing moth species
 Fenestrata (disambiguation)